Presidential elections were held in Portugal on 6 August 1923. The Congress of the Republic elected the president in Lisbon instead of the Portuguese people. However the new president Manuel Teixeira Gomes was elected In absentia, meaning that he wasn't present during the election.

There were a total of 5 candidates. Manuel Teixeira Gomes won the election against his opponents and became the next President of the Republic.

Results

References

Portugal
1923 elections in Portugal
1923
August 1923 events